Nevil Maskelyne (1732–1811) was the fifth English Astronomer Royal.

Nevil Maskelyne may also refer to:

Nevil Maskelyne (magician) (1863–1924), British magician and inventor
Nevil Maskelyne (MP) (1611–1679), English MP for Cricklade
Nevil Story Maskelyne (1823–1911), English geologist and politician

See also
John Nevil Maskelyne (1839–1917), English stage magician and inventor of the pay toilet